The Yukon-Kuskokwim Health Corporation (YKHC) administers a health care delivery system for over 50 rural communities in the Yukon–Kuskokwim Delta in southwest Alaska. The YKHC is accredited by the Joint Commission.

The YKHC system consists of a primary facility in Bethel and five sub-regional clinics in Aniak, Emmonak, Hooper Bay, St. Mary's and Toksook Bay. This system offers inpatient services at the Bethel hospital. Primary care, specialty services, pediatric care, emergency services, behavioral health counseling and treatment services, dental and optometry clinics, home care services, specialized programs for people living with diabetes, tobacco cessation, and many outreach/education programs to promote healthy living.

Additionally, the Community Health Aide Program (CHAP) provides village-based primary health care in 47 village clinics in the Yukon-Kuskokwim Delta, including acute, chronic and emergency care, preventative services, and health promotion disease prevention activities to individuals, families, and their communities.

Location and climate
It is located where the Yukon and Kuskokwim rivers empty into the Bering Sea on the west coast of Alaska. The delta, which mostly consists of tundra, is protected as part of the Yukon Delta National Wildlife Refuge.

Bethel – Within the heart of the Yukon-Kuskokwim Delta lays Bethel, a hub community for 56 surrounding villages, the gateway to the Yukon Delta, and home to the Yukon-Kuskokwim Health Corporation.

The Yukon-Kuskokwim Health Corporation also has five sub-regional clinics that can provide many of the same services found at the Bethel Hospital site. The clinics are located in:

Emmonak – Only  from the Bering Sea, Emmonak sits on the north bank of the Kwiguk Pass at the mouth of the Yukon River. 

St. Mary's – Serving two cities, St. Mary's sub-regional clinic offers residents of both the namesake city and Andreafsky the wide range of services and treatments the predominantly Yup’ik community relies on throughout the year.

History
Formed by a group of tribal leaders and representatives from 48 villages of the Y-K Delta, the Yukon-Kuskokwim Health Corporation was born from a vision of retaining more control over the provision of health care services and improving the retention of passionate providers.

Incorporated one year after its formation, in 1969, YKHC's roots date back to the inception of the Indian Health Service in 1955. YKHC has grown to become the largest employer in the Y-K Delta.

Key Dates:
 1907 – The U.S. Bureau of Education began employing Physicians and Nurses in rural Alaskan Hospitals and Dispensaries
 1969 – Yukon-Kuskokwim Health Corporation is founded
 1970 – YKHC leases 16 buildings in Bethel for YKHC employees
 1978 – Beginning of Otitis Media Program to help diagnose and treat ear problems
 1979 – Pre-Hospital Emergency Medical Services began
 1995 – Opened Aniak Sub-Regional Clinic
 1996 – Opened Delta Supportive Living Facility
 1997 – Opening of Pitka's Point Village Clinic, Aeromed International and YKHC's Travel Management Center 
 1998 – Opening of Transitional Living Facility, and Tuluksak and Napakiak Village Clinics
 1999 – Opened Crisis Respite Center and Family Hostel (Qarartarvik); Began Village-to-Bethel Medevacs
 2000 – JCAHO accreditation received; New Clinics in Lower Kalskag, Alakanuk, Holy Cross, and Crooked Creek completed
 2001 – Opening of Emmonak, Kwigillingok and St. Mary's Sub-Regional Clinics, Delta Immediate Care Clinic, Pediatric Specialty Clinic; McCann Treatment Center opens to treat inhalant abuse
 2003 – Opened eight new Village Clinics
 2005 – Opened Toksook Bay Sub-Regional Clinic and eight new Village Clinics
 2009 – YKHC Research Trial to study vaccine against pneumococcal disease in children begins
 2009 – Opened Hooper Bay Sub-Regional Clinic
 2013 - Opened the YKHC Elders Home, a Long Term Care facility in Bethel

Services

A complete health system, YKHC consists of the primary facility in Bethel, sub-regional clinics in Aniak, Emmonak, Hooper Bay, St. Mary's and Toksook Bay, and various Village Health Clinics throughout the 56 communities served. Services include:

 Behavioral health 
 Central Supply and Reprocessing/Operating Room
 Dental – full service dental clinic 
 Diabetes prevention & control – offers outreach, education and clinical services
 Diagnostic imaging – Comprehensive services offering mammograms, CAT Scans and telemedicine
 Emergency Department – YKHC is the only Level IV ER in the area
 Home care – includes in-home services to care for elders and medically frail people who might otherwise have to go to a long-term care facility or nursing home
 Infection control
 Inpatient unit – Professional nursing care for adult and pediatric patients admitted to the hospital
 Laboratory – Full service laboratory testing
 Long Term Care - As of 2013, YKHC has an 18-bed Long Term Care facility.  
 Nutrition services – Providing assessment and counseling for patients; some of the more common diagnoses are malnutrition, anemia, hyperlipidemia, diabetes (either type II or gestational DM), obesity, cardiovascular diseases, and failure to thrive. 
 Obstetric services – Comprehensive prenatal care and an inpatient birthing center
 Optometry – Provides a full scope of primary eye care, including routine eye exams, contact lens fittings and ocular disease management
 Outpatient ambulatory clinic – Three ambulatory clinics are housed in the hospital
 Pediatrics – With 50% of the Y-K Delta population under the age of 18, this unit provides local primary care and consultative care for children
 Pharmacy – Serving a patient population greater than 28,000 and fills approximately 1,000 prescriptions per day 
 Physical therapy – Providing treatment for muscular, skeletal, neurological or orthopedic conditions
 Respiratory therapy 
 Social services
 Specialty clinics – Includes Gynecology, Urology, Cardiology, Neurology and Dermatology services 
 Women's health – Provides outreach, education and clinical services; screenings include mammograms, Pap tests, clinical breast exams, and other diagnostic tests as necessary

Unique illnesses
The diverse aspects of the Yukon-Kuskokwim Delta environment result in a number of diseases that are rarely seen in the lower 48 states. YKHC medical professionals diagnose and treat illnesses such as:  
 Botulism
 Tuberculosis
 Animal bites
 Methicillin-resistant Staphylococcus aureus, or MRSA
 Frostbite
 Alveolar Hydatid Disease – a parasitic disease caused by the larval stage of a microscopic tapeworm Echinococcus multilocularis
 Haemophilus influenzae type b (Hib) – a bacterial disease which usually infects children under 5 years of age and causes a number of illnesses such as pneumonia, occult febrile bacteremia, meningitis, epiglottitis, septic arthritis, cellulitis, otitis media, purulent pericarditis, and other less common infections such as endocarditis, and osteomyelitis

In addition to these rare diseases, YKHC medical professionals also diagnose diabetes, cancer, ear infections, respiratory syncytial virus, and other diseases that are commonly seen throughout the United States.

Notes

External links
Yukon-Kuskokwim Health Corporation website

Bethel, Alaska
Healthcare in Alaska

http://www.hospitalinspections.org/report/27954